Fort Albert (map reference ) is a tower fort nestling under the cliffs south-west of Fort Victoria on the Isle of Wight, England. It was also known as Cliff End Fort, named after the Northern extremity of Colwell Bay (Cliff's End).

History
Fort Albert was one of the Royal Commission forts built in the 19th Century as part of Lord Palmerston's defences against the possibility of a French attack from Napoleon III. Designed to defend the Needles Passage, it was completed in 1856, after 4 years of construction, but like the American Third System forts it resembles in miniature, it would have suffered badly from rifled gunfire, so the Royal Commission enhanced it with batteries on the cliffs above. Even so, with the introduction of armoured ships, the fort became obsolete by 1858. In 1886 it was selected as one of the UK locations for the Brennan torpedo. After this, only small guns were mounted on the fort. It was closed to military use in 1957.

Fort Albert today

The fort is in private ownership and has been converted into private flats. There is no public access, not even to the cliff tops which overlook it. It is most easily viewed from the sea, or from Hurst Castle. The battery above is part of a chalet estate at Brambles Chine.

It has been a Grade II* Listed Building since 1994.

References

Publications

External links 

 Victorian Forts data sheet

Albert
Albert
Grade II* listed buildings on the Isle of Wight
Grade II* listed forts